Kitione Taliga (born 21 April 1993) is a Fiji rugby union player.

Taliga hails from the village of Dratabu, Nadi and attended Ratu Navula Secondary School. He made a name for himself playing local 7's tournaments with the Wardens Rugby Club. It was  here where he caught the attention of Ben Ryan and was drafted into the Fiji Sevens Team.

Awards
 2016 Canada Sevens – DHL Impact Player of the Tournament.
 2016 Singapore Sevens – DHL Impact Player of the Tournament.

References

External links

 
 
 Zimbio Bio

Fijian rugby union players
Living people
Fiji international rugby sevens players
1993 births
Rugby union centres
Rugby union wings
Pacific Islanders rugby union players
I-Taukei Fijian people
Fijian people of I-Taukei Fijian descent
Rugby union fly-halves
Rugby union fullbacks
Male rugby sevens players
Rugby sevens players at the 2016 Summer Olympics
Olympic rugby sevens players of Fiji
Olympic gold medalists for Fiji
Olympic medalists in rugby sevens
Medalists at the 2016 Summer Olympics
Fijian Drua players